The Stotts were a British family of architects.

Stott or Stotts may also refer to:

People
Alicia Boole Stott (1860–1940), British mathematician
Amanda Stott (born 1982), Canadian Singer
Bryson Stott (born 1997), American baseball player
Christopher Stott (born 1969), British businessman, husband of Nicole Stott
Craig Stott (born 1990), Australian actor
Etienne Stott (born 1979), British, Olympic canoeist
George Stott (missionary) (1889–?), British missionary to China
Gordon Stott (1909–1999), Lord Advocate of Scotland
John Stott (1921–2011) British, Evangelical cleric and theologian
Kathryn Stott (born 1958), British pianist
Ken Stott (born 1954), Scottish film and television actor
Kevin Stott (born 1967), American, FIFA soccer referee
Lally Stott (1945–1977), British songwriter
Mary Stott (1907–2002), British feminist and journalist
Muriel Stott (1889–1985), Australian architect
Nicole Stott (born 1962), American astronaut
Peter A. Stott (fl. 1989–2007), British scientist and expert on climate change
Philip Stott (born 1945), British academic and climate–change sceptic
Ramo Stott (born 1934), American stock car driver
Rebecca Stott (born 1964), British author and academic
Rebekah Stott (born 1993), New Zealand association footballer
Robert Stott (1858–1928), Australian police commissioner
Robert Stott (soldier) (1898–1984), British military commander
Ron Stott (1938–2014), American businessman and politician
Philip Sidney Stott (1858–1937), architect, civil engineer and surveyor
Terry Stotts (born 1957), American basketball coach and former player
Wally Stott (1924-2009), British musician, composer and conductor

Other
 Stott and Sons, an architectural firm founded by Abraham Henthorn Stott
 Stott's College, an Australian college
 Stotts Creek, a stream in the United States
 Støtt or Støttvær, an island group in northern Norway

See also
Stotz, surname
Stotting, an animal behaviour

English-language surnames